Guðbjörg Norðfjörð Elíasdóttir (born 8 April 1972) is an Icelandic former basketball player and the current vice-chairman of the Icelandic Basketball Federation. As a player, she was named the Icelandic Women's Basketball Player of the Year in 1999 and was a seven-time selection to the Úrvalsdeild kvenna Domestic All-First Team. Guðbjörg won the Icelandic championship three times and the Icelandic Cup four times. She was a member of the Icelandic national basketball team from 1990 to 2002.

In 2001, Guðbjörg was voted as one of the twelve players on the Icelandic team of the 20th century.

Playing career

Club career
Guðbjörg started her career with Haukar where she won the Icelandic Cup in 1992. Despite being reigning cup champions, lack of funds and interest from the Haukar basketball department resulted in the team folding before the start of the 1992–93 season, forcing Guðbjörg to transfer to KR.

In 1999, she helped KR go undefeated through the league and cup, winning both the national championship and the Icelandic Cup.

Guðbjörg missed the majority of the 2000–2001 season after the birth of her first child. She returned before the end of the season, averaging 6.8 points in 4 regular season games. In the playoffs, she helped KR go undefeated, sweeping ÍS in the semi-finals and Keflavík in the finals.

In September 2001, Guðbjörg announced that she would not play with KR during the season and a few days later she signed with her hometown team Haukar in the second-tier 2. deild kvenna. On 5 November, in her first official game back with Haukar, Guðbjörg scored 26 points in a victory against Laugdælir. On 11 November, she had 23 points and 11 rebounds in a loss against Keflavík in the Company Cup. That turned out to be her last game with Haukar as a few days later she transferred back to KR. Without Guðbjörg, KR had stumbled out of the gates, losing 4 out of its first 9 games. With her, the team finished with 9 victories in its last 11 games, good for second place in the league. For the season she averaged a team leading 16.6 points per game while shooting 40.6% from three point range and league leading 93.6% from free throws. In the playoffs, Guðbjörg helped KR overcome a 0-2 deficit against ÍS in the Úrvalsdeild finals to win the national championship for the second year in a row.

After playing for the national team during the summer, Guðbjörg retired from basketball in August 2002. Over her Úrvalsdeild career, Guðbjörg scored 3,122 points in 264 games.

National team career
Guðbjörg played 53 games for the Icelandic national basketball team between 1990 and 2002. She retired following the 2002 European Promotion Cup.

Icelandic Basketball Federation
Guðbjörg was elected as the vice-chairman of the Icelandic Basketball Federation in 2006, where she served until 2007, and again in 2009.

Awards, titles and accomplishments

Individual awards
Icelandic basketball team of the 20th century: 2000
Icelandic Women's Basketball Player of the Year: 1999
Úrvalsdeild Domestic Player of the Year: 1997
Úrvalsdeild Domestic All-First Team (7): 1993, 1994, 1996, 1997, 1998, 1999, 2000

Titles
Icelandic champion (3): 1999, 2001, 2002
Icelandic Basketball Cup (4): 1992, 1999, 2001, 2002
Icelandic Supercup: 1999
Icelandic Company Cup: 2000

Accomplishments
Úrvalsdeild scoring leader: 1999
Úrvalsdeild three-point percent leader (2): 1997, 1999
Úrvalsdeild free throw percent leader: 2002

References

1972 births
Living people
Gudbjorg Nordfjord
Gudbjorg Nordfjord
Gudbjorg Nordfjord
Gudbjorg Nordfjord
Gudbjorg Nordfjord
Forwards (basketball)